Torstein Kvamme (14 March 1893 – 26 June 1985) was a Norwegian politician for the Christian Democratic Party.

He was born in Vossestrand.

He was elected to the Norwegian Parliament from Hordaland in 1954, and was re-elected on two occasions. He had previously served as a deputy representative in the periods 1945–1949 and 1950–1953.

Kvamme was involved in local politics in Voss municipality from 1931 to 1940.

References

1893 births
1985 deaths
Christian Democratic Party (Norway) politicians
Members of the Storting
20th-century Norwegian politicians